Marina Alandra Vaizey, Baroness Vaizey,  ( Stansky; born 16 January 1938) is an art critic and author based in the UK.

Vaizey is an Anglo-American broadcaster, exhibition curator and journalist. She was educated at the Brearley School, Putney School, Radcliffe College, and Girton College, Cambridge. She was formerly Art Critic for the Financial Times and Sunday Times and editor of the Art Quarterly and Review. She has written several books on art.  She now lectures including at the National Gallery and British Museum. She was a founding Trustee of the Geffrye Museum and has also been a trustee of the Imperial War Museum and the South Bank. She is a current trustee of ACE Foundation. She has also been a judge for the Turner Prize.

Lady Vaizey was born in New York City, daughter of Lyman Stansky, a lawyer. She moved to Britain in 1959. In 1961, she married the economist John Vaizey, Lord Vaizey, who died in 1984. One of their sons is Ed Vaizey, Member of UK Parliament and columnist.

She was appointed Commander of the Order of the British Empire (CBE) in the 2009 New Year Honours.

Works

 John Golding, Paintings and Drawings, Kettle's Yard Gallery, Cambridge (1975).
 The St. Michael’s Guide to Famous Paintings, Marks & Spencer Ltd (1979)
 Andrew Wyeth, Royal Academy of Arts (1980).
 The Artist as a Photographer, Sidgwick and Jackson, Sep. (1982). 
 Peter Blake London: Weidenfeld & Nicolson, Chicago: Academy Publishers (1986). 
 Steve Buck, New Sculpture Observed, Angel Row Gallery, Nottingham (1990)
 Christo (20th Century Artists Series), Rizzoli International Pub. (1990). 
 Jørgen Haugen Sørensen, Kunstbogklubben, Forlaget Søren Fogtdal, Copenhagen, 1994.
 À La Rencontre De 100 Peintures Célèbres (French), Chantecler (1997),  
 Picasso’s Ladies, Jewelry by Wendy Ramshaw (co-authored with Paul Greenhaulgh and Eric Turner), Merrell Pub. Ltd (1998). 
 Art: The Critics’ Choice, Watson and Guptill (1999). 
 Sutton Taylor: A Lustrous Art, UK, Hart Gallery (1999). 
 Great Women Collectors (co-authored with Charlotte Gere), UK: P. Wilson. USA: H. Abrams (1999). 
 Max Couper: The Plot, Booth-Clibborn Editions (2002). 
 Smile, British Museum Press (2002). 
 Colin Rose: Edge to Edge, Black Dog Publishing Ltd (2003). 
 Art - The Critics Choice: 150 Masterworks of Western Art Selected and Defined by the Experts, New Line Books (2005). 
 Lucian Freud, Mapping the Human,  CV Publications (2012). 
 Figure to Ground: Five Painters, Cv Publications (2012). 
 David Hockney and the Yorkshire Landscape (co-authored with James Cahill, Michael Lovell-Plank and edited by Nicholas James), CV Publications (2012). 
 Photography and Art: Documents and Dreams (co-authored with Anne Blood), CV Publishing (2013).

Footnotes

External links 
 ACE Cultural Tours information

1938 births
Living people
British journalists
The Sunday Times people
British art critics
American art critics
Commanders of the Order of the British Empire
Alumni of Girton College, Cambridge
Writers from New York (state)
American women journalists
Radcliffe College alumni
American women critics
The Putney School alumni
Brearley School alumni
Spouses of life peers
British baronesses
21st-century American women